The 2014 European Parliament election was held in the European Union, from 22 to 25 May 2014.

It was the 8th parliamentary election since the first direct elections in 1979, and the first in which the European political parties fielded candidates for President of the Commission. The candidates, sometimes referred to by the German term Spitzenkandidaten (English: top candidates), were Jean-Claude Juncker for the European People's Party, Martin Schulz for the Party of European Socialists, Guy Verhofstadt for the Alliance of Liberals and Democrats for Europe Party, Ska Keller and José Bové jointly for the European Green Party and Alexis Tsipras for the Party of the European Left. The Alliance of European Conservatives and Reformists and the European Alliance for Freedom declined to nominate candidates.

While the European People's Party lost ground to the Progressive Alliance of Socialists and Democrats, it remained the largest faction in the new parliament, resulting in the EPP's nomination of Jean-Claude Juncker as Commission President at the European Council. In turn, the European Council accepted the nomination by a simple majority (only David Cameron and Viktor Orban voted against Juncker).

Background
The Council of the European Union decided to hold the 2014 elections in late May instead of early June as had been the case with previous EP elections. The elections were brought forward to provide more time for the election of a president of the European Commission, and because they would otherwise have coincided with the Pentecost weekend which falls during school holidays in many member states.

The ongoing Eurozone crisis, an offshoot of the Great Recession, started several months after the last Parliament election in June 2009. Although it affected most EU member states, the hardest-hit economies were those of southern Europe: Greece, Cyprus, Italy, Spain, and Portugal, along with Ireland. Among other reasons, harsh austerity measures significantly affected the public approval of EU leadership. The percentage of Greeks approving the EU leadership decreased from 32% in 2010 to 19% in 2013, while in Spain, the approval dwindled more than a half from 59% in 2008 to 27% in 2013. Overall, only four of the 27 members countries approved the EU leadership. Peter S. Goodman suggests that "distrust about the treaties and conventions that hold together modern Europe appear at an all-time high." "Europe's establishment parties are widely expected to suffer their worst performance" since 1979, with the three mainstream parties (EPP, PES, ALDE) expected to collectively gain 63% of the vote, a 10% loss since 2009.

The Economist estimated in January 2014 that "anti-EU populists of the left and right could take between 16% and 25% of the parliament's seats, up from 12% today." Euromoney predicted "anti-EU populists and nationalists" winning around 150 seats in the parliament, almost 20% of the total. A Policy Network article from February 2014 suggested that despite the media focus on anti-EU parties, they "will undoubtedly remain modest compared to" other mainstream parties, but "their growth and their intentions to cooperate, signify important changes for the EU and European politics." In several countries, far-right and right-wing populist parties were expected to be in contention to poll the most votes in this election, including parties in Austria (Freedom Party), Denmark (People's Party), France (National Front), the Netherlands (Party for Freedom), and the UK (UKIP). In Greece, the left-wing Coalition of the Radical Left (SYRIZA) consistently led the polling in the leadup to the election. In Italy the populist and anti-establishment Five Star Movement, according to the polls, was expected to be the second most popular party after the Democratic Party, with about 25% of votes.

In January 2014, José Manuel Barroso, President of the European Commission, said, "We are seeing, in fact, a rise of extremism from the extreme right and from the extreme left" and suggested that the election might become "a festival of unfounded reproaches against Europe."

Presidential candidates
The Lisbon Treaty, which entered into force on 1 December 2009, provides that the European Parliament shall endorse or veto the appointment of the president of the European Commission on the basis of a proposal made by the European Council, taking into account the European elections (article 17, paragraph 7 of the Treaty on European Union). This provision applied for the first time for the 2014 elections.

Nevertheless, senior figures such as European Council president Herman Van Rompuy, German Chancellor Angela Merkel, and former Commission president Jacques Delors questioned the aspiration of European political parties to link the presidency of the European Commission with the result of the European elections and insisted that the future Commission president has to suit Member States' expectations first.

Based on these new provisions, the following European political parties designated candidates for Commission president ahead of the 2014 election: the Party of European Socialists (PES), the European People's Party (EPP), the Alliance of Liberals and Democrats for Europe Party (ALDE party), the European Green Party (EGP), the Party of European Left (EL) and the European Democratic Party.

European People's Party
On 6 and 7 March 2014, the congress of the European People's Party in Dublin elected Jean-Claude Juncker as its presidential candidate, who run against Michel Barnier, and adopted an election manifesto. Juncker set out the priorities he would have as president:
Create growth and jobs
Reform and reorganise the European energy policy into a new energy union
Negotiate a reasonable and balanced trade agreement with the United States
Continue with the reform of the Economic and Monetary Union, with the European social dimension in mind
Re-balance the relationship between elected politicians and the European Central Bank in the daily management of the Eurozone
Re-balance the way in which we grant conditional stability support to Eurozone countries in financial difficulties
Strengthen the external projection of our monetary union
give an answer to the British question
Juncker also set out five priorities on the subject of immigration:
Implement the Common European Asylum System
Step up the practical assistance provided by the European Asylum Support Office
Step up cooperation with third countries, particularly North African countries
More political determination when it comes to legal migration
Secure Europe's borders

Finally he set out three foreign policy objectives:
Making the High Representative act like a true European Minister of Foreign Affairs
Permanent structured cooperation in defence matters
A pause for enlargement

Party of European Socialists
The Common Candidate process of the Party of European Socialists was carried out according to the following timetable:
 1–31 October 2013: nominations.
 6 November 2013: PES Presidency meeting to check the candidacies and publish the official list of candidates.
 1 December 2013 – 31 January 2014: internal selection process within each member Party or organisation.
 February 2014: PES Election Congress to ratify the votes on the candidate, adopt the Manifesto, and launch the PES European election campaign.

Following the defeat of the Party of European Socialists during the European elections of June 2009, the PES made the decision that PES would designate its candidate for Commission president in December 2009, which rapidly triggered debates about how to select this candidate. The PES Congress gathering in Brussels in November 2011 made the decision that it would select the PES candidate through internal primaries in each of its member parties and organisations. Member parties and organisations are free to determine their own voting process, including by opening it to non-members.
 Possible candidates: José Luis Zapatero, Margot Wallström, Helle Thorning Schmidt, Frans Timmermans, Borut Pahor, Sergei Stanishev, Wouter Bos, José Sócrates, Werner Faymann, Pascal Lamy.
 Declared candidate: Martin Schulz
 Elected candidate: Martin Schulz

Alliance of Liberals and Democrats for Europe Party
The timetable of the Alliance for Liberals and Democrats for Europe Party (ALDE) for designating its candidate for President of the European Commission is:
 28–30 November: Nominations opens & Election Manifesto adopted at London Congress
 19 December: Pre-Summit liberal leaders meeting to discuss nominations received
 20 December: Nominations formally close
 1 February: ALDE Party Candidate to be announced at special Electoral Congress, Brussels

In 2012, the Alliance of Liberals and Democrats for Europe Party (ALDE) members were said to be "struggling" to find a candidate for Commission president ahead of the 2014 European elections. Guy Verhofstadt was considered to be the likely nominee, but a meeting of the then-ELDR party held in Dublin from 8 to 10 November 2012 did not agree to formally nominate him yet; concerns voiced included the fact that it was considered unlikely that Verhofstadt would have a chance of getting elected as President of the European Commission, as Anders Fogh Rasmussen (the incumbent Secretary General of NATO) was expected to be appointed to the post of President of the European Council or High Representative of the Union for Foreign Affairs and Security Policy after the 2014 election, and two liberal politicians in the EU's top ranks were not expected to be considered acceptable. While a compromise position was reached (to nominate a candidate for Commission President "in time for the 2014 European Parliamentary election campaign"), the corresponding resolution was not passed due to disagreements on other points included in the resolution. The ALDE political party finally decided to discuss candidates at the party's pre-summit meeting at the margins of the 19–20 December European Council. Belgian daily De Standaard and EU news website EurActiv reported during the summit that the ALDE party has appointed Mark Rutte and Christian Lindner as 'mediators' between Rehn and Verhofstadt to work out who would be the candidate.
 Possible candidates: Anders Fogh Rasmussen, Guy Verhofstadt, Olli Rehn
 Declared candidates: Guy Verhofstadt, Olli Rehn
 Elected Candidate: Guy Verhofstadt

European Green Party
In July 2013 European Green Party (EGP) announced that it would run an open primary online. Open to all inhabitants in the union over the age of 16 who "support green values", this resulted in Ska Keller and José Bové being elected candidates. Other qualified candidates were Rebecca Harms and Monica Frassoni.

Party of the European Left
Meeting on 19 October 2013 in Madrid, the Council of chairpersons of the Party of the European Left (EL) decided to designate a common candidate for the president of the European Commission to prevent "the forces responsible for the crisis" from keeping the monopoly during the electoral campaign. The Council reaffirmed however that this new measure "will not hide, as European leaders and the troika hope, their authoritarianism".

The Council decided to submit to the decision of the next Congress, 13 to 15 December in Madrid, the candidacy of Alexis Tsipras, who "would be the voice of resistance and hope against the ultra-liberal policies and facing the threat of the extreme right". As Alexis Tsipras will therefore be the only candidate for the job, the Council has mandated the Presidency of the EL to consult all members and observers parties of the EL and the GUE/NGL group in the European parliament about this application. Tsipras's candidature was confirmed on 15 December. Alexis Tsipras was elected.

European Democratic Party
On 2 December 2013 in Rome, the Council of the European Democratic Party decided to designate a candidate on the occasion of the next meeting in February 2014, along with its manifesto. The next president of the Commission will have to "settle a more political Commission". Allied with the Liberals in the ALDE Group but opposed to Olli Rehn, the European Democratic Party welcomed the candidature of Guy Verhofstadt, ALDE Group leader. The party adopted its manifesto on 28 February and named Guy Verhofstadt as its candidate for the Presidency of the European Commission on 12 March. Guy Verhofstadt was elected.

Alliance of European Conservatives and Reformists
The Alliance of European Conservatives and Reformists did not present a candidate for the European Commission presidency. They argued that participating in the process would legitimate a federalist vision of a European super-state and that the lack of a European demos makes the process illegitimate.

European Free Alliance
The European Free Alliance stands for "a Europe of Free Peoples based on the principle of subsidiarity, which believe in solidarity with each other and the peoples of the world."
It consists of various national-level political parties in Europe advocating either full political independence (statehood), or some form of devolution or self-governance for their country or region. The alliance has generally limited its membership to progressive parties, and therefore, not all European regionalist parties are members of EFA.
The EFA stands on the left of the political spectrum, and in the Brussels declaration it emphasises the protection of human rights, sustainable development and social justice. In 2007 the EFA congress in Bilbao added several progressive principles to the declaration: including a commitment to fight against racism, antisemitism, discrimination, xenophobia and islamophobia and a commitment to get full citizenship for migrants, including voting rights.

European Christian Political Movement
The European Christian Political Movement, abbreviated to ECPM, is a political party at European level that unites national parties from across Europe that share Christian democratic politics. The member parties are generally more socially conservative and Eurosceptic than the European People's Party, not only at this election allied with the AECR, without any candidate as well.

European Pirate Party
The newly founded European Pirate Party elected MEP Amelia Andersdotter (who is running for re-election) and The Pirate Bay co-founder Peter Sunde (running for election in Finland) as its candidates for the European Commission presidency. The European Pirate Party is not recognised as a European political party.

Televised debates
The lead candidates designated for nomination to the European Commission presidency participated in various debates, conducted in different countries and variously, in French, German and English. A total of ten debates were held through April and May in the lead up to the election period. Five debates were designed as head-to-head debates between the representatives of the two leading European political parties: Jean-Claude Juncker of the European People's Party and Martin Schulz of the Party of European Socialists. Four others were open to all nominated lead candidates, while one French-language debate was held between José Bové of the European Green Party and Guy Verhofstadt of the Alliance of Liberals and Democrats for Europe Party.

Opinion polls
No pan-European opinion polls are carried out; however, several institutes compiled predictions of the outcome of the elections based on national polls.

Some of the institutes below, such as Pollwatch, applied algorithms to the national poll results before aggregating them, in an attempt to account for the lower than expected results received by governing parties in previous European Parliament elections. However, other institutions did not share the expectation that governing parties would automatically perform worse than the polls suggest.

Note: Percentages indicate proportion of predicted seats and not vote share.

Apportionment of seats

Decisions on the apportionment of seats in the Parliament are governed by article 14 of the Treaty of Lisbon. This article lays down that "The European Parliament shall be composed of representatives of the Union's citizens. They shall not exceed seven hundred and fifty in number, plus the President. Representation of citizens shall be degressively proportional, with a minimum threshold of six members per Member State. No Member State shall be allocated more than ninety-six seats."

It had been the stated desire of the member-state governments to ratify the Treaty of Lisbon before the 2009 election, so that its articles governing the European Parliament could be in force for that election. However, this was blocked by the Irish rejection of the treaty in a referendum. Therefore, in June 2009, the European Parliament was elected under the rules of the Treaty of Nice, which provided for 736 seats, instead of the 751 to be provided in the Treaty of Lisbon.

The Lisbon Treaty was subsequently ratified, and provisional measures were ratified in December 2011 to give the 18 additional seats, to the countries entitled to them, before the 2014 elections, without withdrawing Germany's 3 extra seats. These 18 additional MEPs brought the number of MEPs to 754 temporarily until 2014. These 18 "phantom MEPs" would initially have observer status, before becoming full members of the parliament if an additional protocol is ratified by 2014.

Thus the 2014 election will be the first to apply the apportionment of seats provided by the Lisbon treaty.

Andrew Duff MEP (ALDE, UK) tabled two reports in March 2011 and September 2012 proposing new apportionments of seats (see table opposite). Article 14 provides that "The European Council shall adopt by unanimity, on the initiative of the European Parliament and with its consent, a decision establishing the composition of the European Parliament", respecting the principle of degressive proportionality, the threshold of 6 MEPs for smaller member states and the limit of 96 MEPs for larger member states.

Election dates

Results
The centre-right European People's Party won the most seats, but came up well short of a majority.  In Denmark, France, and United Kingdom rightist groups opposed to the European Union won "unprecedented" victories according to some news organisations such as Reuters.  Elsewhere, populist parties won significant seats.  In total, roughly a quarter of all seats went to parties sceptical of the EU or protest parties.  Thus, the election was seen as anti-establishment. In the wake of the election, several prominent political figures said the EU needed to realign its priorities in a hurry. Dutch Prime Minister Mark Rutte called for "fewer rules and less fuss", while British Prime Minister David Cameron said "Europe should concentrate on what matters, on growth and jobs, and not try to do so much."

Group reshuffling
Between the election and the inaugural session of the 8th European Parliament, scheduled for 1 July, some parties and individual MEPs usually switch allegiances between the political groups of the European Parliament. This process, which sometimes has resulted in the disappearance of whole political groups from the Parliament, or their recomposition in another form, is particularly important for new parties and MEPs.

Announced membership changes

The following table describes the announced membership changes in the Parliament groupings and the impact on the Parliament makeup:

A group is required to be made up by at least 25 MEPs from seven Member States to be constituted in the new legislature.

A proposed European Alliance for Freedom (EAF) group, said to be composed of the French FN, Dutch PVV, Austrian FPÖ, Belgian VB and Italian LN, was unable to reach the threshold. About a year later, on 16 June 2015, the same parties formed the Europe of Nations and Freedom group together with two MEPs from KNP and a former UKIP MEP.

Make-up following election

Based on the new groupingon the ENF, the Parliament makeup following the election were as follows:

Voter turnout
The final turnout figure for the 2014 European Parliament elections reached an all-time low at 42.54%, and thus marked a continued downward turnout since the first direct election. The result was also lower than the number communicated immediately after the elections. During the election night exit polls suggested a turnout of 43.1% based on preliminary figures. This was then revised down to 43.09% a few days later. There was a small increase in absolute voter numbers, with 163,551,013 valid votes cast in 2014 as compared to 160,687,462 in 2009, though this was outweighed by the increase in eligible voters from 386,711,169 in 2009 to 396,104,240 in 2014.

New European Commission

The leaders of the parliament's seven groups met on Tuesday 27 May to discuss who should become the new president of the European Commission. Citing the Lisbon Treaty's requirement for the result of the elections to be "taken into account", five of the seven groups issued a statement saying that Juncker should be nominated by the European Council to be president. Only the ECR and EFD disagreed. However, when the European Council met that evening, they said that nominations should only be made "after having held the appropriate consultations". They authorised van Rompuy, President of the Council, to consult with the new group leaders in the European Parliament and to report back to their summit on 26 June. The leaders of the UK, Hungary and Sweden were said to have opposed Juncker although the Swedish government then declared that Sweden never had such opposition. Leaders of the European People's Party publicly acknowledged that Juncker may not end up heading the executive European Commission. Friday, 27 June, the European Council eventually proposed to the European Parliament the candidacy of Jean-Claude Juncker to the presidency of the European Commission. The United Kingdom and Hungary opposed Juncker's nomination, while the remaining Council members supported his candidacy. The European Parliament confirmed Juncker's nomination on a vote of 422 in favour to 250 opposed, 47 abstentions and 10 invalid votes. Most EPP, Socialist and Liberal MEPs supported Juncker's nomination.

The appointment of top EU jobs in the new government was expected to be contentious.  Leaders of EU member states agreed to seek a package deal that would give significant posts to the new political parties in an effort to win back public support for the European Parliament. According to German Chancellor Angela Merkel, the new government will focus on making EU economies more competitive in the global economy, seek common energy and environmental policies, and seek a united foreign policy.

The main political groups, including the EPP and the S&D, in the European Parliament on 12 June backed the right of Jean-Claude Juncker to be the next head of the European Commission, after talks with the President of the European Council Herman Van Rompuy.

Juncker has stated that his priorities would be the creation of a digital single market, the development of an EU energy union, the negotiation of the Transatlantic trade agreement, the continued reform of the economic and monetary union, with the social dimension in mind and a 'targeted fiscal capacity' for the Euro area, as well as to negotiate a new deal with Britain, which ultimately failed to be accepted in the Brexit vote.

References

Further reading

External links

 
 Eurovision debate
 Image-movie of the EU-campaign "Act. React. Impact." (YouTube)
 

 
2014 elections in Europe
May 2014 events in Europe